Black Scorpion is a superhero TV series that aired on the Sci-Fi Channel in 2001. It aired in Canada on Space. The series is based on two Roger Corman Showtime TV-movies: Black Scorpion (1995) and its sequel Black Scorpion II: Aftershock (1997). The show focuses on a female police officer, who by night takes to the streets and fights crime as the superhero the Black Scorpion.

Episodes from the series were combined into straight-to-video movies, with episodes 1.1 and 1.2 as Black Scorpion Returns released in 2001 and episodes 1.1, 1.3, and 1.8 as Sting of the Black Scorpion released in 2002.

The series was available on DVD in North America.

Lead character

Darcy Walker

The Black Scorpion's real name is Darcy Walker, played by Michelle Lintel. She lives in Angel City (a fictionalized version of Los Angeles), where she works as a police detective. Darcy's father was shot by the city's crooked district attorney. The D.A. was arrested, but the charges were suspiciously dropped. That was when Darcy decided to take to the streets as the vigilante, Black Scorpion. In the original Corman films, the role of Darcy was played by Joan Severance. In the series, she is a red-headed enforcer with a badge who enforces the law more efficiently without the badge as her crime-fighting alter ego, Black Scorpion. She appears to be a big fan of the color black, a fact she made clear during an interview after being asked a trivial question to would explain the color of her costume. However, as shown in the first episode, her choice of the scorpion relates to an old fable about a scorpion trying to cross a river, which her father had told to her.

Black Scorpion
Apart from being an excellent hand-to-hand fighter and an expert with computers, Black Scorpion, just like Batman, has no superpowers. She relies on various specially developed technologies, chief among them the car called the Stingray with voice command weaponry and a disguise capability to make it look like a regular Corvette. The "Scorpionmobile" in the first episode was the movie version, which was destroyed and a new version was created for the run of the series.  Only one exists in the world, which is owned by Nate Truman of StarCarCentral.com. She also wears a ring that shoots powerful blasts of energy and possesses a similar transformation capability to the Stingray for when Darcy needs to switch into her heroine costume in the field, like the Flash does in costume only from his lightning bolt Flash ring.

Other major characters 
Detective Steve Rafferty is Darcy's partner and love interest. Apart from Darcy, Steve is the best cop on the force. At present, he is on a mission to unmask the Black Scorpion. Darcy wants to tell Steve that she is the Black Scorpion, but whenever she tries, the opportunity slips away. Steve may also have a crush on the Black Scorpion, which visibly upsets Darcy, forming a bizarre love triangle between Steve, herself, and her costumed alter ego. He is played by Scott Valentine. Of special note, Scott Valentine played a cameo in the second Black Scorpion film as minor thug.
Specs and Slugger: A pair of incompetent cops, they work with Darcy and Steve. Often, the two get into car crashes while chasing Black Scorpion. They are played by Shane Powers and Steven Kravitz, respectively. Of note, they are the only characters, save Gangster Prankster and Aftershock, to return for the series with their original actors.
Argyle Sims: Darcy's personal mechanic, he is the only person whom Darcy allowed to know her identity unconditionally, since he freely gave her most of her more hi-tech equipment. He is somewhat a mentor figure to her at times, but his role is watered down somewhat in the series, only seeming to appear when a new gadget is needed. In one episode, he garbed himself as the "Argyle Avenger", after tipping off Detective Steve Rafferty, who could not make it in time to aid Darcy (Black Scorpion) foil the antagonist's plot. He is played by Brandon Terrell (listed as BT in the credits).
Tender Lovin' (Veronica): Argyle's girlfriend and a former hooker, Argyle and she are constantly arguing about relationship issues. She is played by Enya Flack.
Arthur "Artie" Worth: Angel City's extremely corrupt mayor, played by Robert Pine, he is often involved in various shady deals either to fund his campaign for re-election or his extravagant lifestyle. Many criminals in the city are created because of this, including his own deputy mayor.
Dr. Phineas Phoenix: A scientist who deals in reanimating the dead and creating clones, his goal is to take a criminal and reform him into a productive member of society. As a result, several of Black Scorpion's enemies return from fatal defeats at her hand (Breathtaker, Inferno, and Gangster Prankster). He is played by Raye Birk.
Capt. Henry Strickland is the equally unqualified chief of police in the Angel City precinct and the morbidly obese senior officer of Darcy, Steve, Specs and Slugger, and all the rest of the force. Rather than conduct serious police work, the captain spends more time stuffing his fat face and chasing after either Specs and/or Slugger whenever they are getting up to something stupid. His first assignment while on the police force as a junior officer had him unjustly imprison Ben Tickerman for a crime he did not commit. A hallucinogenic intoxication brought on by Breathtaker showed his worst nightmare as being subordinate to the vigilante Black Scorpion who was chief of police, indicating some mild insecurities about his job position. He is played by Guy Boyd.

Villains

Returning enemies
Breathtaker (Adam West): The first villain Black Scorpion fought, and the reason for her existence. Due to brain damage suffered from a gunshot wound through the lungs, Dr. Noah Goddard is unable to breathe without a special armor he created. After losing his career due to his condition, Goddard became the super-villain Breathtaker, and vowed revenge upon the City of Angels via an asphyxiating gas. His killing of Darcy's father is what drove Darcy to become the titular vigilante. Despite dying in the first Black Scorpion movie, Breathtaker is resurrected by Dr. Phoenix.
Skills: Respiratory surgery, artificial organ replacement, Aerosol chemistry

Weapons: Gas dispensers, mind controlling vapors

Aftershock (Sherrie Rose): Originally a benevolent seismologist, Professor Ursula Undershaft became the super-villain Aftershock after Mayor Worth ordered the sabotage of a machine she created that could predict earthquakes, as he had hoped to collect on earthquake insurance. With her public image in shambles, Undershaft set out on a rampage of revenge, ultimately planning on creating a massive earthquake that would demolish the city. Seemingly dying after supposedly sacrificing herself to stop her plan in the second movie, Black Scorpion II: Aftershock, the series reveals that she survived and landed in a coma, from which she awakes, and resumes her vendetta. Later died for real when crushed under falling debris, but was soon resurrected by Dr. Phoenix. 
Skills: Seismologist

Weapons: Shockwave gauntlets

The Gangster Prankster (Stoney Jackson): The older brother of Argyle, Luther Simms was driven mad when their parents were shot by dirty cops, and he laughed, thinking it was a joke...until he saw the blood was real. Now stuck with a nightmarish permanent grin on his face, Luther became the super-villain, the Gangster Prankster, and sought to avenge his parents. Unlike Aftershock, the Gangster Prankster died for real in the second movie, and was brought back by Dr. Phoenix, when the doctor tried to rehabilitate him. Naturally, it backfired, and Simms resumed his super-villain career. He died again in his second appearance in the series when Argyle exposes him to his own lethal gas, causing him to literally explode from laughing.
Skills: Criminal mastermind with a warped sense of humor.

New enemies
FireArm (Martin Kove): A former cop in the City Of Angels, Jack Ames was forced into early retirement when the actions of the psychotic General Stryker cost him an arm. Outfitted with a prosthetic gun arm, Ames resurfaced As FireArm, and set out to force Mayor Worth to repeal a proposition that would stipulate the waiting period of weapon purchases. He seemingly dies when he blows up his headquarters, but not before getting his revenge on Stryker.
Weapons: Prosthetic gun arm

Hurricane (Athena Massey): Exposed to the toxic waste in the city's ocean (put there by Mayor Worth's goons on his orders), marine biologist Gail Weathers gained the ability to psychically control the weather. With her equally mutated henchmen, The human-octopus hybrid Squids, Weathers reinvented herself as Hurricane, and plotted to flood the city.
Powers: Weather control

Flashpoint (Allen Scotti): The top photojournalist at the Angel's Herald, Cameron Albright was obsessed with uncovering Black Scorpion's secret identity. This would ultimately be his downfall, as when he attempted to snap a pic of her unmasked face while she was facing the Red Dragons, and she used her Scorpion Ring to stop him, accidentally blinding him in the process. Now wanting revenge, despite his eyes being fixed by advanced laser surgery, Albright became the super-villain Flashpoint, and sought to blind the rest of the city, so they could live in darkness like him.

Skills: Ex-photojournalist; criminal mastermind

Inferno (Brent Huff): Originally a dedicated firefighter who struck up a romance with Darcy, Adam Burns stil resolved to help people after Mayor Worth made cutbacks that cost him his job. While chasing an arsonist (who was Mayor Worth's former cellmate, and acting on his orders), Adam was hit by solar energy, causing him to burn anything he touched. Driven mad by this, Adam became Inferno, and died at the end of his first appearance. He was later resurrected by Dr. Phoenix.

Powers: Pyrokinesis

Medusa (Lisa Boyle): Disfigured due to a schoolyard prank, Minerva Stone was cruelly nicknamed Medusa, until the day she found magic mineral water that restored her beauty. She then developed a cement gun that turned people to stone, which she then used on all the bachelors that visited her spa in Angel City, placing them in her garden, with Steve being one of her victims.

Skills: Criminal mastermind

Weapons: Cement gun

Clockwise (Frank Gorshin): Wrongfully imprisoned on faulty charges for twenty-five years by then beat cop Henry Strickland, Ben Tickerman learned how to make clocks in prison, and became obsessed with time. Upon release from prison, Tickerman and his three henchmen, the tall Big Hand, the diminutive Small Hand, and the evil Hourglass, became the time themed terrorist, Clockwise, and set about avenging himself upon the people responsible for his imprisonment, using a special device he created to accelerate their aging process. He was later killed when Black Scorpion reflected the deceive's beam back on, rapidly aging him to dust.

Skills: Criminal mastermind with mastery of precision timing; Engineering

Weapons: Time freezing stopwatch; Age accelerating device

Aerobicide (Renee Allman): A misandrist who, after excessive exercise destroyed her muscles and cost her the use of her legs, was outfitted with cybernetic implants that increased her strength and agility to superhuman levels. Hellbent on reducing the male population of the city, Suzy Pain now named Aerobicide and her two female goons, Bend (Faith Salie) and Stretch (Ava Fabian) targeted rich men and literally had them exercise to death, then stole their money. Aerobicide was eventually killed when Black Scorpion took control of her implants, and gave her a taste of her own medicine.

Powers: Cybernetically enhanced strength and agility

Pollutia (Julie McCullough): A former student of Breathtaker, Dr. Ariel Haze was dedicated to protecting the environment, but her contact with him cost her her job. Wanting to help her former mentor, Haze attempted to steal a chemical that would help Breathtaker breath without his armor. During a fight with Black Scorpion, the chemical spills on Haze, enabling her to transmute her body into smog. Dubbing herself Pollutia, Haze sets out to kill all polluters. In her final battle with Black Scorpion, Pollutia was sucked up by the Stingray's Aero Vacuum, and trapped in a bottle.

Powers: Smog conversion

Greenthumb (David Lander): A florist whose heart was shattered by Mayor Worth's bimbo secretary, Babette, Eugene Gardner turned to a life of crime as the vile vegetation villain, Greenthumb. Still infatuated with Babette, Greenthumb unleashed a deadly pollen on the city on Valentine's Day, and blackmailed the city for the antidote. He died when he was eaten by one of his own plants.

Skills: Florist, chemistry

Mindbender (Lana Clarkson): Dr. Sarah Bellum once a promising computer scientist and housing advocate, implored the Mayor to fund her VR simulation research for the homeless of Angel City. Bitterly rejected she would resume her research into virtual reality when an attempted robbery of her computer system caused a surge while she's immersed in her own video game frying her mind. Now becoming the deadly supervillain Mindbender, she schemed to use her digitizing skills to entrap individuals within her pixelized domain. Engineering it to kill those in the real world when they die in the virtual one. She was left trapped in her own broken reality after her defeat by Black Scorpion.

Skills: Virtual Reality Programming

Slapshot: Former hockey pro and old friend of Steve's, Ricky Blade was purposely injured by his own teammates and left paralyzed from the waist down. Given a high tech battle suit that restored the use of his legs and gave him super strength, he took the name Slapshot and sought revenge on his traitorous teammates with help from his cheerleader henchwomen. He was defeated and arrested by Black Scorpion with help from Steve.

Skills: Hockey playing

Weapons: Cybernetic battle suit; Metal hockey stick; Explosive hockey pucks

Angel of Death: Detective Angela Archer, whose father was a preacher who was killed by a thief, was relieved of duty for excessive force. Using arsenic-laced lipstick and taking the name Angel of Death, she sought to rid the streets of all criminals with her kiss of death. Her endgame was to fill the prison with poison gas to kill all the inmates, but was foiled by Black Scorpion, ironically with help from the city super-villains, and arrested.

Skills: martial arts

Weapons: arsenic-laced lipstick

Stunner: (Alison Armitage) Deputy Mayor Edwina Watts is the bemoaned right hand woman of the sleazy Mayor Arthur Worth. Often made the butt of the joke due to having been scapegoated by her inept boss for every one of his failed political bankrolling schemes. She's near fatally electrocuted when a prisoner execution goes awry, having gained the power to absorb and redistribute energy. Ms. Watts takes on a new guise with the codename Stunner and wreaks electric havoc on the city of angels in an attempt to usurp Mayor Worth's position. She was eventually defeated by Black Scorpion who used her stun ring to siphon her electrical energies then stun her into unconsciousness.

Powers: Electrical Channeling

Vox Populi: (Shannon Whirry) Considered to be the worst musical talent in all Angel City, Vox and her band The Bleeding Eardrums would often cause trouble after every gig they'd play. Regularly resulting in the brutal injuries of most of the audience. Contracted by the corrupt Mayor Worth to air hypnotic songs to boost his reelection campaign. She was eventually beaten and done in by the Black Scorpion, being blasted off a roof with her own guitar.

Skills: (terrible) musician

Weapons: sound manipulating guitar

Episodes

References

External links

2001 American television series debuts
2001 American television series endings
2000s American crime television series
2000s American science fiction television series
English-language television shows
Live action television shows based on films
Superhero television series
Syfy original programming